Le ragazze di San Frediano (English: The Girls of San Frediano) is a 1949 novel by Italian author Vasco Pratolini.

Plot

The novel is set in Florence at the end of the Second World War.  The story follows the escapades of a Florentine mechanic, a local "Don Giovanni," who romances several women simultaneously and secretly.  His multiple relationships come to the women's attention, and they conceive a plot to punish the mechanic for his behavior.

Film adaptations

The novel has been adapted to film twice:

In 1954, a cinematic adaptation directed by Valerio Zurlini was released.  The film represented Zurlini's directorial debut, and was one of the first movies to be filmed in Florence.  The 1954 film starred:
Antonio Cifariello as Bob;
Rossana Podestà as Tosca;
Corinne Calvet as Bice;
Giovanna Ralli as Mafalda;
Marcella Mariani as Gina; and
Giulia Rubini as Silvana.
In 2007, a television miniseries adaptation aired on Italian television channel Rai Uno.  This adaptation was directed by Vittorio Sindoni and starred:
Giampaolo Morelli as Bob;
Camilla Filippi as Tosca;
Donatella Salvatico as Bice;
Vittoria Puccini as Mafalda;
Chiara Conti as Gina; and
Martina Stella as Silvana.

References

External links

20th-century Italian novels
1949 novels
Novels set in Florence
Italian romantic comedy films
1950s Italian films